Farai Vimisayi (born 30 October 1983) is a retired Zimbabwean football striker.

References

1983 births
Living people
Zimbabwean footballers
Lancashire Steel F.C. players
Dynamos F.C. players
Hwange Colliery F.C. players
Zimbabwe international footballers
Association football forwards
Sportspeople from Kwekwe
Zimbabwe Premier Soccer League players